Argyrotaenia granpiedrae is a species of moth of the family Tortricidae. It is found in Cuba.

The wingspan is 14–15 mm. The ground colour of the forewings is cream, somewhat suffused with rust along the costa. The strigulae (fine streaks) and base of the wing are rust, as are the markings. The hindwings are grey cream, strigulated with grey.

Etymology
The species name refers to Gran Piedra, the type locality.

References

Moths described in 2010
granpiedrae
Moths of the Caribbean
Endemic fauna of Cuba